Ernesto Luis Torres Torreani (born 7 November 1952 in Asunción, Paraguay) is a former footballer who played as a midfielder.

Honours

Club
 Olimpia
 Paraguayan Primera División: 1978, 1979, 1980, 1981
 Copa Libertadores: 1979
Copa Interamericana: 1979
Intercontinental Cup: 1979

Titles

References

External links
 .

1952 births
Living people
Paraguayan footballers
Paraguay international footballers
Copa América-winning players
1979 Copa América players
Club Nacional footballers
Club Olimpia footballers
Association football midfielders